The 2017 Incarnate Word Cardinals football team represented the University of the Incarnate Word in the 2017 NCAA Division I FCS football season. The Cardinals were in their first full season of FCS and Southland Conference eligibility, as they had completed their four-year transition to Division I from Division II. They were led by sixth-year head coach Larry Kennan. They played their home games at Gayle and Tom Benson Stadium. They finished the season 1–10, 1–7 in Southland play to finish in ninth place.

On November 28, head coach Larry Kennan was fired. He finished at Incarnate Word with a six-year record of 20–46.

Previous season
The Cardinals finished the season 3–8, 3–6 in Southland play to finish in a tie for eighth place.

Schedule
Source:  

Source:

Personnel
Source:

Coaching staff

Roster

Depth chart

Postseason honors
The following Cardinals received postseason honors for the 2017 season:

Associated Press FCS All–America First–Team
P  Joe Zema – Senior

STATS FCS All–America First–Team
P  Joe Zema – Senior

STATS FCS All–America Second–Team
KR  Desmond Hite – Sophomore

AFCA FCS Coaches' All–America Second–Team
P  Joe Zema – Senior

HERO Sports FCS All–America First–Team
P  Joe Zema – Senior

HERO Sports FCS All–America Second–Team
KR  Desmond Hite – Sophomore

All–Southland Conference First–Team
P  Joe Zema – Senior
KR  Desmond Hite – Sophomore

All–Southland Conference Second–Team
AP  Desmond Hite – Sophomore

All–Southland Conference Honorable Mention
RB  Derrick Mitchell – Senior
OL  Terence Hickman II – Sophomore
LB  Mar'Kel Cooks – Sophomore

Athletic Directors Association (ADA) FCS Top Collegiate Punter
P  Joe Zema – Senior

Game summaries

@ Fresno State

Sources: Box Score

@ Sacramento State

Sources: Box Score

@ Stephen F. Austin

Sources: Box Score

Abilene Christian

Sources: Box Score

@ Southeastern Louisiana

Sources: Box Score

Lamar

Sources: Box Score

@ McNeese State

Sources: Box Score

Nicholls State

Sources: Box Score

@ Sam Houston State

Sources: Box Score

Central Arkansas

Sources: Box Score

Prairie View A&M

Sources: Box Score

References

Incarnate Word
Incarnate Word Cardinals football seasons
Incarnate Word Cardinals football